Negro Fort (African Fort) was a short-lived fortification built by the British in 1814, during the War of 1812, in a remote part of what was at the time Spanish Florida. It was intended to support a never-realized British attack on the U.S. via its southwest border, by means of which they could "free all these Southern Countries [states] from the Yoke of the Americans." 

Built on a site overlooking the Apalachicola River, about 15 miles north of present-day Appalachicola, Florida, it was the largest structure between St. Augustine and Pensacola. Trading posts of Panton, Leslie and Company and then John Forbes and Company, loyalists hostile to the United States, had existed since the late eighteenth century there and at the San Marcos fort, serving local Native Americans and fugitive slaves. The latter, runaway or freed colored slaves from plantations in the American South, used their experience of farming and animal husbandry to set up farms stretching for miles along the river.

When withdrawing in 1815, at the end of the war, the British commander Edward Nicolls, insured that "the fort was left intact for the use of the Indians. Instead, it came into the possession of a band of free renegade Negroes."  It is the largest and best-known instance before the American Civil War in which armed fugitive Africans (they were no longer enslaved) resisted European Americans who sought to return them to slavery. (A much smaller example was Fort Mose, near St. Augustine.)

The fort was destroyed in 1816, while under the command of General Edmund P. Gaines, when a "hot cannon ball" landed in the magazine, destroying the fort.  This action is also sometimes referred to as the Battle of Negro Fort (also called the Battle of Prospect Bluff or the Battle of African Fort). The formerly enslaved Africans were not familiar with use of cannons and other heavy munitions, and they were thus unable to defend themselves. Colonel Duncan L. Clinch, the attacking commander, reported salvaging approximately "2,500 muskets, 50 carbines, [and] 400 pistols" from the ruins; as well as inflicting nearly 300 casualties to the fort's occupants. The salvaged arms were given to Colonel Clinch's allies, the Creeks, as war booty for their help in taking the fort.

This is the only time in its history in which the United States destroyed a community of escaped formerly enslaved Africans in another country. However, the area continued to attract escaped Africans until the U.S. construction of Fort Gadsden in 1818.

The Battle of Negro Fort (African Fort) was the first battle of the Seminole Wars.

Construction of the fort
Construction of the fort began in May 1814, when the British seized the trading post of John Forbes and Company. By September, there was a square moat enclosing a large field several acres in size. There was a  wooden stockade  the length of the moat, with bastions at its eastern corners. Several hundred feet inland was the magazine, in which stands of arms and 73 kegs of gunpowder were stored.

The fort also had "dozens of axes, carts, harnesses, hoes, shovels, and saws," along with many uniforms, belts, and shoes. The British left all these behind.

To attract recruits, the British visited the Creek, Seminole, and "negro settlements" along the river and its tributaries, distributing guns, uniforms, and other goods. The Creeks were enthusiastic about this opportunity to attack the United States, whose settlers had taken their land. At the request of the British, they started inviting Blacks to join them. Enslaved Africans of the Spanish in Pensacola were also invited, and came by the hundreds.  As a result, the British Post was a "beehive of activity" in 1814. Commander Nicolls had under his command, at Prospect Bluff, or living up the river, some 3,500 men eager to attack the Americans. Most of the Africans/Blacks did not want to return to be slaves of the Spanish in Pensacola, some of them adopting English names and claiming to be fugitives from the United States so 
that they would not be returned.

A refuge for fugitive slaves
Fugitive slaves had been seeking refuge in Florida for generations, where they were well received by the Seminoles and treated as free by the Spaniards if they converted to Catholicism; the origins of the future Underground Railroad are here. The Spaniards wanted their own Pensacola slaves back, but as far as American slaves they did not much care. In any event, they lacked the resources to find and "recover" them, at one point inviting the American slaveowners to catch the fugitives themselves. 

Fugitive slaves continued to arrive, seeking in Florida their freedom; they set up a network of farms along the river to keep them supplied. The Seminoles knew how to do this because the former African slaves, who had learned on plantations how to farm and care for domestic animals, either taught them or did their farming for them, or both. The Creeks knew nothing of farming and were impoverished; even Nicolls commented on the number of starving, resourceless Creeks who were arriving, and the challenge of feeding them. The Creeks had a champion, Indian Agent Benjamin Hawkins, who tried to help them recover their lands. They had never been enslaved and thus did not have to worry about being returned to slavery. They wanted to return to their lands, taken or threatened by white settlers.

The fugitive slave situation became more serious as news of a Negro Fort (African Fort) with weaponry spread through the southern United States.

Negro Fort
The Negro Fort (African Fort) flew the British Union Jack, as the former Colonial Marines considered themselves British subjects. The Spaniards continued their policy of leaving the fugitive slaves alone. What was different now was that a corps had had some military training, and was well armed, and had been encouraged by departing abolitionist Nicolls to get others to run away from their owners and join them. The number and ethnicity of men, and in some cases their families, at the Negro Fort was not fixed; they came and went as the unstable political situation evolved. Yet the existence of a fortified, armed sanctuary for fugitive slaves became widely known in the southern United States.

The pro-slavery press in the United States expressed outrage at the existence of Negro Fort. This  concern was published in the Savannah Journal:It was not to be expected that an establishment so pernicious to the Southern states, holding out to a part of their population temptations to insubordination, would have been suffered to exist after the close of the war [of 1812]. In the course of last winter, several slaves from this neighborhood fled to that fort; others have lately gone from Tennessee and the Mississippi Territory. How long shall this evil, requiring immediate remedy, be permitted to exist?

Escaped slaves came from as far as Virginia. The Apalachicola, as was true of other rivers of north Florida, was a base for raiders who attacked Georgia plantations, stealing livestock and helping the enslaved workers escape. Other slaves escaped from the militia units near the border, in which they had been serving. To correct this situation, seen by Southerners as intolerable, in April 1816 the U.S. Army decided to build Fort Scott on the Flint River, a tributary of the Apalachicola. Supplying the fort was challenging because transporting materials overland would have required traveling through unsettled wilderness. The obvious route to supply the Fort was the river. Although technically this was Spanish territory, Spain had neither the resources nor the inclination to defend this remote area. Supplies going to or from the newly-built Fort Scott would have to pass directly in front of the Negro Fort. The boats carrying supplies for the new fort, the Semelante and the General Pike, were escorted by gunboats sent from Pass Christian. The defenders of the fort ambushed sailors gathering fresh water, killing three and capturing one (who was subsequently burned alive); only one escaped.

When the U.S. boats attempted to pass the fort on April 27 they were fired upon. This event provided a casus belli for destroying Negro Fort.

Hawkins and other white settlers made contact with Andrew Jackson, seen as the person most capable of doing so. Jackson requested permission to attack, and started preparations. Ten days later, without having received a reply, he ordered Brigadier General Edmund P. Gaines at Fort Scott to destroy Negro Fort. The U.S. expedition included Creek Indians from Coweta, who were induced to join by the promise that they would get salvage rights to the fort if they helped in its capture. On July 27, 1816, following a series of skirmishes, the U.S. forces and their Creek allies launched an all-out attack under the command of Lieutenant Colonel Duncan Clinch, with support from a naval convoy commanded by Sailing Master Jarius Loomis]. Secretary of State John Quincy Adams, who called Negro Fort "a seat of banditti and the receptacle for runaway slaves," later justified the attack and subsequent seizure of Spanish Florida by Andrew Jackson as national "self-defense", a response to Spanish helplessness and British involvement in fomenting the "Indian and Negro War". Adams produced a letter from a Georgia planter complaining about "brigand Negroes" who made "this neighborhood extremely dangerous to a population like ours." Southern leaders worried that the Haitian Revolution or a parcel of Florida land occupied by a few hundred blacks could threaten the institution of slavery. On July 20, Clinch and the Creek allies left Fort Scott to assault Negro Fort (African Fort) but stopped short of firing range, realising that artillery (gunboats) would be needed.

Battle of Negro Fort (African Fort)

The Battle of Negro Fort (African Fort) was the first major engagement of the Seminole Wars period, and marked the beginning of General Andrew Jackson's conquest of Florida. Three leaders of the fort were former Colonial Marines who  had come with Nicolls (since departed) from Pensacola. They were: Garçon ("boy"), 30, a carpenter and former slave in Spanish Pensacola, valued at 750 pesos; Prince, 26, a master carpenter valued at 1,500 pesos, who had received wages and an officer's commission from the British in Pensacola; and Cyrus, 26, also a carpenter, and literate. Prince may have been the military commander of the same name at the head of 90 free blacks brought from Havana to assist the Spanish defense in St. Augustine during the Patriot War of 1812. As the U.S. expedition drew near the fort on July 27, 1816, black militiamen had already been deployed and began skirmishing with the column before regrouping back at their base. At the same time the gunboats under Master Loomis moved upriver to a position for a siege bombardment. Negro Fort was occupied by about 330 people at the time of the battle. At least 200 were maroons, armed with ten cannons and dozens of muskets. Some were former Colonial Marines. They were accompanied by thirty or so Seminole and Choctaw warriors under a chief. The remaining were women and children, the families of the black militia.

Before beginning an engagement General Gaines first requested a surrender. Garçon, the leader of the fort, refused. Garçon told Gaines that he had orders from the British military to hold the post, and at the same time raised the Union Jack and a red flag to symbolize that no quarter would be given. The Americans considered the Negro Fort to be heavily defended; after they formed positions around one side of the post, the Navy gunboats were ordered to start the bombardment. Then the defenders opened fire with their cannons, but they had not been trained in using artillery, and were thus unable to utilise it effectively. It was daytime when Master Jarius Loomis ordered his gunners to open fire. After five to nine rounds were fired to check the range, the first round of hot shot cannonball, fired by Navy Gunboat No. 154, entered the Fort's powder magazine. The ensuing explosion was massive, and destroyed the entire Fort. Almost every source states that all but about 60 of the 334 occupants of the Fort were instantly killed, and others died of their wounds shortly after, including many women and children. A more recent scholar says the number killed was "probably no more than forty", the remainder having fled before the attack. The explosion was heard more than 100 miles (160 km) away in Pensacola. Just afterward, the U.S. troops and the Creeks charged and captured the surviving defenders. Only three escaped injury; two of the three, an Indian and a Black person, were executed at Jackson's orders. General Gaines later reported that:

Garçon, the black commander, and the Choctaw chief, among the few who survived, were handed over to the Creeks, who shot Garçon and scalped the chief. African-American survivors were returned to slavery. There were no white casualties from the explosion. The Creek salvaged 2,500 muskets, 50 carbines, 400 pistols, and 500 swords from the ruins of the fort, increasing their power in the region. The Seminole, who had fought alongside the blacks, were conversely weakened by the loss of their allies. The Creek participation in the attack increased tension between the two tribes. Seminole anger at the U.S. for the fort's destruction contributed to the breakout of the First Seminole War a year later. Spain protested the violation of its soil, but according to historian John K. Mahon, it "lacked the power to do more."

Aftermath
The largest group of survivors, including blacks from the surrounding plantations who were not at the Fort, took refuge further south, in Angola, Florida. Some other refugees founded Nicholls Town  in the Bahamas.

Garçon was executed by firing squad because of his responsibility for the earlier killing of the watering party, and the Choctaw Chief was handed over to the Creeks, who scalped him. Some survivors were taken prisoner and placed into slavery under the claim that Georgia slaveowners had owned the ancestors of the prisoners. Neamathla, a leader of the Seminole at Fowltown, was angered by the death of some of his people at Negro Fort (African Fort) so he issued a warning to General Gaines that if any of his forces crossed the Flint River, they would be attacked and defeated. The threat provoked the general to send 250 men to arrest the chief in November 1817 but a battle arose and it became an opening engagement of the First Seminole War.

Anger over the destruction of the fort stimulated continued resistance during the First Seminole War.

See also
 Angola, Florida
 Black Seminoles
 Fort Mose Historic State Park
 Fort Scott 
 Quilombo

References

Further reading (most recent first)

External links
 
 "North America's Largest Act of Slave Resistance", a 2015 lecture by Nathaniel Millett
 Tragedy and Survival: Virtual Landscapes of 19th-Century Gulf Coast Maroon

 
Conflicts in 1816
1816 in the United States
Battles of the Seminole Wars
Native American history of Florida
Pre-emancipation African-American history
History of Florida
Naval battles and operations of the American Indian Wars
Pre-statehood history of Florida
July 1816 events
Tourist attractions in Franklin County, Florida
African-American history of Florida
Colonial forts in Florida
Spanish Florida
Underground Railroad locations
19th-century establishments in the Spanish Empire
Populated places on the Underground Railroad
Demolished buildings and structures in Florida
Native Americans of the Seminole Wars
Maroons (people)
American rebel slaves
Former populated places in Franklin County, Florida
Slave rebellions in the United States
Seminole Wars
African-American military monuments and memorials
Black Seminoles
Landmarks of the War of 1812
War of 1812 forts
Populated places established by African Americans
African-American tourist attractions in Florida
Fugitive American slaves
Andrew Jackson
History of racism in Florida